Paduka Sri Sultan Tajul Ariffin ibni Almarhum Sultan Mansur Shah I (died 1594) was the fourth Sultan of Perak. He was the son of the second Sultan of Perak, Sultan Mansur Shah I and brother of the previous Sultan Ahmad Tajuddin Shah.

Sultan Tajul Ariffin resides in an area called Semat which is located between Manong and Kuala Kangsar. He ruled the Perak Sultanate for 10 years from 1584 until his death in 1594.

When Tajul Ariffin died, his body was buried in Pulau Semat, Kuala Kangsar and was known as Marhum Mangkat di Tebing. Next to his tomb, there is also the tomb of his wife named Putri Ajaib. There is also not much information available about the life and reign of Sultan Tajul Ariffin.

References 

Sultans of Perak
1594 deaths
Royal House of Perak
Malay people
People of Malay descent
Muslim monarchs
Sultans
Sunni monarchs
People from Perak